Gravity Kills is the debut studio album by industrial rock band Gravity Kills. It was released in 1996 on TVT Records. The album sold roughly 500,000 copies.

The first song was titled "Take" on the promo version of the album. It was renamed "Forward" just before the album was released.

The song "Blame" uses a sample from the song "Illusion", composed by the Japanese group Geinoh Yamashirogumi for the highly influential 1988 anime movie Akira.

Album cover 
The picture in the centre on the front cover is called "Picturing The Bomb". The image is owned by Rachel Fermi and Esther Samra.

Track listing 
All the track titles on the album are each only one word in length.

Games appearances

Videos 
 "Guilty"
 "Enough" (Two versions)
 "Down" (w/ live footages) (Unreleased video)
 Blame (L.A. Remix version)

In other media 
"Guilty" was featured in Seven (stylized as Se7en), a 1995 thriller film by David Fincher.
 "Last" was featured in a Doug Ellin's 1998 romantic comedy film, Kissing A Fool.
 A remix version of "Blame" was featured in the Escape from L.A. soundtrack.
 A demo version of "Goodbye" was featured in the 1995 action and adventure film, Mortal Kombat.

Personnel
Gravity Kills
 Jeff Scheel - Lead vocals
 Matt Dudenhoeffer - Guitars
 Doug Firley - Keyboards
 Kurt Kerns - Drums and Bass

Production
 Produced by John Fryer and Gravity Kills
 Engineered by Tim Donovan
 Mixed by John Fryer
 Photography (Inner tray) by Rocky Morton
 Mastering by Howie Weinberg
 Written by Gravity Kills
 Design by Robin Glowski and Greg Knoll
 Artwork by Greg Knoll and Kurt Kerns

Charts

Album

Singles

References

External links
Official Gravity Kills at MySpace
Official Gravity Kills at Facebook
Official Gravity Kills on Twitter
Gravity Kills at Discogs

Gravity Kills albums
1996 debut albums
Albums produced by John Fryer (producer)
TVT Records albums
Virgin Records albums
Industrial rock albums